Petrica Dimofte is a Romanian sprint canoer who competed from the early 1980s. He won a silver medal in the K-4 10000 m event at the 1982 ICF Canoe Sprint World Championships in Belgrade.

References

Living people
Romanian male canoeists
Year of birth missing (living people)
ICF Canoe Sprint World Championships medalists in kayak